Anandrao Vithoba Adsul (born 1 June 1947) was a member of the 16th Lok Sabha of India. He represented the Amravati constituency of Maharashtra and is a member of the Shiv Sena (SS) political party.
He had represented the Amravati constituency in 15th Lok Sabha and Buldhana constituency of Maharashtra  in the 14th Lok Sabha, 13th Lok Sabha and 11th Lok Sabha.

He has been honored with Sansad Ratna Award in 2011, 2012 and 2013. In July 2022, he resigned from Shiv Sena as a leader of the party.

Career 
He served as a Member of Parliament (Lok Sabha) from Amravati (Lok Sabha constituency) till 2019. He served as the Union Minister of State for Finance in Prime Minister Atal Bihari Vajpayee's cabinet till 2004. He was the chairperson of two corporations from 1995 to 1999 in the Shiv Sena-led government in Maharashtra. 

Adsul contested the 2019 Lok Sabha election as a Shiv Sena candidate, and he lost the election by 30,000 votes to Navneet Kaur Rana, a former Telugu actress who contested the election as an independent candidate. 

In October 2021, his name surfaced in the news in connection with an alleged ₹980-crore fraud at City Co-operative Bank, which is being investigated by the Enforcement Directorate (ED).

Positions held
 1996: Elected to 11th Lok Sabha (1st term)
 1999: Re-elected to 13th Lok Sabha (2nd term)
 Oct. 1999-Jul. 2002: Chief Whip, Shiv Sena Parliamentary Party, Lok Sabha.
 1999–2002: Member, Committee on Human Resource Development.
 2000–2002: Member, Committee on Transport and Tourism.
 2000-Mar. 2002: Member, Consultative Committee, Ministry of Railways.
 Jul. 2002-Aug. 2002: Leader, Shiv Sena Parliamentary Party
 26 Aug. 2002 - May 2004: Union Minister of State, Ministry of Finance and Company Affairs.
 2009 Re-elected to 15th Lok Sabha (4th term)
 6 Aug. 2009 - Member, Committee on Public Accounts
 31 Aug. 2009 - Member, Committee on Petroleum and Natural Gas
 23 Sep. 2009 - Member, Committee on Government Assurances
 5 May 2010 - Member, Committee on Public Accounts.
 2014: Re-elected to 16th Lok Sabha (5th term)
 1 Sep. 2014: Chairperson, Standing Committee on Chemicals and Fertilizers.
 2018: Appointed Leader of Shiv Sena Party.

References

External links
 Shivsena Home Page
 Anandrao Adsul Profile

Living people
1947 births
India MPs 2009–2014
India MPs 2004–2009
India MPs 1999–2004
Marathi politicians
India MPs 1996–1997
People from Buldhana
Lok Sabha members from Maharashtra
Shiv Sena politicians
India MPs 2014–2019